Alice Hoffman (born March 16, 1952) is an American novelist and young-adult and children's writer, best known for her 1995 novel Practical Magic, which was adapted for a 1998 film of the same name. Many of her works fall into the genre of magic realism and contain elements of magic, irony, and non-standard romances and relationships.

Early life and education
Alice Hoffman was born in New York City and raised on Long Island, New York. Her grandmother was a Russian-Jewish immigrant.  She graduated from Valley Stream North High School in 1969, and then from Adelphi University with a Bachelor of Arts. She was a Mirrielees Fellow at the Stanford University Creative Writing Center in 1973 and 1974, where she earned a Master of Arts in Creative Writing.

Career
When Hoffman was twenty-one and studying at Stanford, her first short story, At The Drive-In, was published in Volume 3 of the literary magazine Fiction. Editor Ted Solotaroff contacted her, and asked whether she had a novel. At that point, she began writing her first novel, Property Of. It was published in 1977, by Farrar Straus and Giroux, now a division of Macmillan Publishers. A section of Property Of was published in Solotaroff's literary magazine, American Review.

Hoffman's first job was at Doubleday, which later published two of her novels.

She was the recipient of a New Jersey Notable Book Award for Ice Queen. She won a Hammett Prize for Turtle Moon.
She wrote the screenplay for the 1983 film Independence Day, starring Kathleen Quinlan and Dianne Wiest.

In September 2019 Hoffman released The World That We Knew based on a true story told to her by a fan at a book signing. The woman confided to Hoffman that during World War 2, her Jewish parents had her live with non-Jewish people to escape the Nazis. These were known as "hidden children" and Hoffman thought about this woman and her unusual upbringing for years before deciding to travel to Europe and learn more.

The third novel in her "Practical Magic" series, Magic Lessons, was released in October 2020. This prequel takes place in the 17th century and explores the life of Maria Owens, the family matriarch.

For Scholastic Press, Hoffman has also written the young adult novels Indigo, Green Angel, and its sequel, Green Witch. With her son Wolfe Martin, she wrote the picture book Moondog.

In 2015, Hoffman donated her archives to her alma mater, Adelphi University.

Personal life
She resides in Boston. After being treated for breast cancer at Mount Auburn Hospital in Cambridge, she helped establish the hospital's Hoffman Breast Center.

Bibliography

Novels

 Property Of (1977)
 The Drowning Season (1979)
 Angel Landing (1980)
 White Horses (1982)
 Fortune's Daughter (1985)
 Illumination Night (1987)
 At Risk (1988)
 Seventh Heaven (1990)
 Turtle Moon (1992)
 Second Nature (1994)
 Practical Magic (1995)
 Here on Earth (1997)
 Local Girls (1999)
 The River King (2000)
 Blue Diary (2001)
 The Probable Future (2003)
 Blackbird House (2004)
 The Ice Queen (2005)
 Skylight Confessions (2007)
 The Third Angel (2008)
 The Story Sisters (2009)
 The Red Garden (2011)
 The Dovekeepers (2011)
 The Museum of Extraordinary Things (2014)
 The Marriage of Opposites (2015)
 Faithful (2016)
 The Rules of Magic (2017) – prequel to Practical Magic
 The World That We Knew (2019)
 Magic Lessons (2020) - prequel to Practical Magic
 The Book of Magic (2021) - sequel to Practical Magic

Young adult novels
 Aquamarine (2001)
 Indigo (2002)
 Green Angel (2003)
 Water Tales: Aquamarine & Indigo (omnibus edition) (2003)
 The Foretelling (2005)
 Incantation (2006)
 Green Witch (sequel to Green Angel) (2010)
 Green Heart (omnibus of Green Angel & Green Witch) (2012)

Middle grade books
 Nightbird (2015)

Children's books
 Fireflies: A Winter's Tale (illustrated by Wayne McLoughlin) (1999)
 Horsefly (paintings by Steve Johnson and Lou Fancher) (2000)
 Moondog (with Wolfe Martin; illustrated by Yumi Heo) (2004)

Short stories
 Conjure (2014)

Nonfiction
 Survival Lessons (2013)

Filmography
Independence Day (1983) (writer)
Practical Magic (1998) (novel)
Sudbury (2004) (novel)
The River King (2005) (novel)
Aquamarine (2006) (novel)
The Dovekeepers (2014) (novel)

References

External links 

 Alice Hoffman's website
 
 
 Radio Interview on WFMT's Writers on the Record with Victoria Lautman

20th-century American novelists
21st-century American novelists
American children's writers
American people of Russian-Jewish descent
American women novelists
Writers from Cambridge, Massachusetts
People from Long Island
Writers from New York City
Stanford University alumni
Adelphi University alumni
1952 births
Living people
Magic realism writers
American women children's writers
20th-century American women writers
21st-century American women writers
Valley Stream North High School alumni
Novelists from New York (state)
Novelists from Massachusetts
Jewish American novelists
Women science fiction and fantasy writers
21st-century American Jews